Putalibazar, is a municipality and district headquarters in Syangja District in Gandaki Province of central Nepal. Putalibazar is a famous city of Syangja District.

History
Putalibazar is the biggest municipality in Syangja District. According to 2011 Nepal census, it had a total populations of 30,704 people residing in 8,180 individual households. With many VDC, it has been the center for the business and official municipality of Syangja. Before the Waling municipality was named, it was the only municipality in Syangja. The dominant political parties in Putalibazar are Nepali Congress and CPN UML.

On 12 March 2017, the government of Nepal implemented a new local administrative structure consisting of 744 local units. With the implementation of the new local administrative structure, VDCs have been replaced with municipal & village councils. Putalibazar is one of these 744 local units. Putalibazar is created by merging Taksar, Pauwegaude, Thuladihi, Bahakot, Kolma Barahachaur, (1-3,9) Wards of Rangvang & (1,2,4-8) Wards of Pelkachaur.

Political situation
Putalibazar is divided into 14 Wards. It is surrounded by Kaski District & Fedikhola at northern side, Kaski District & Tanahun District from east, Aandhikhola, Arjun Chaupari & Bhirkot Municipality from west and Biruwa & Bhirkot Municipality at south. Birgha Archale is its headquarter.

Population
As Putalibazar is created by merging Taksar, Pauwegaude, Thuladihi, Bahakot, Kolma Barahachaur, (1-3,9) Wards of Rangvang & (1,2,4-8) Wards of Pelkachaur. The sum population of Putalibazar, 44,876, is residing in an area of 146.21 km2.

Media
To Promote local culture, Putalibazar has one FM radio station called Community Radio Syangja FM 89.6 MHz Which is a Community radio Station. Recently in 2019 Syangja television is launched which airs audio video programs covering local and national news.(Ritu Raj Lamsal).

References

Populated places in Syangja District
Syangja District
Municipalities of Syangja District
Municipalities in Gandaki Province
Nepal municipalities established in 1997